Fei Hsia (1910 – 23 July 1995) was a Chinese politician. She was among the first group of women elected to the Legislative Yuan in 1948.

Biography
Fei was born in Zhongxiang County in Hubei province in 1910. She attended Moscow Sun Yat-sen University, graduating from the Department of Political Science. A member of the Chinese Communist Party, she was arrested in 1931 and later married Xu Enzeng, the Director of the Kuomintang Secret Service Headquarters. She was a delegate to the Constituent National Assembly that drew up the Constitution of the Republic of China, and was subsequently a candidate in Hankou in the 1948 elections to the Legislative Yuan, in which she was elected to parliament. She relocated to Taiwan during the Chinese Civil War and died in 1995.

References

1910 births
Moscow Sun Yat-sen University alumni
Members of the Kuomintang
20th-century Chinese women politicians
Members of the 1st Legislative Yuan
Members of the 1st Legislative Yuan in Taiwan
1995 deaths